Roadie is a 1980 American musical comedy film directed by Alan Rudolph about a truck driver who becomes a roadie for a traveling rock and roll show. The film stars Meat Loaf and marks his first starring role in a film. There are also cameo appearances by musicians such as Roy Orbison and Hank Williams Jr. and supporting roles played by Alice Cooper and the members of Blondie.

Plot
Travis W. Redfish is a beer-drinking, bar-brawling, fun-loving Texan, who works as a distributor of Shiner beer. He also helps his father, Corpus C. Redfish with the family salvage company, whose motto is "Everything will work if you let it!" B.B. Muldoon is his best friend and business partner, and the romantic interest of Travis' younger sister Alice Poo.

While B.B. and Travis are making deliveries in their Shiner beer truck, they notice an RV that has broken down on the side of the road. At first, they laugh at the thought of helping the stranded motorists, but then Travis sees wannabee groupie Lola Bouillabaisse smile at him through the rear window of the RV. Travis slams on the brakes and decides to help, hoping to get a closer look at Lola. Lola is a huge fan of Alice Cooper and Travis has never heard of "her". Road manager Ace wants Travis to drive them to Austin for a show to be played by Hank Williams Jr., produced by music mogul Mohammed Johnson. After repairing the RV, Travis lets Lola talk him into driving to Austin, where his ability to set up equipment in record time impresses Johnson, who demands that he work additional shows.

Despite his own loathing for Travis, Ace forces Lola to persuade the unwilling Travis to continue working as their roadie, so Ace can get the credit for his work. Lola takes advantage of Travis' dazed state after a bar fight to get him to drive the group to the airport (eluding a police pursuit on the way) for a flight to Hollywood. Travis is angry and homesick when he wakes up and finds himself in Hollywood, but relents when Lola cries. He saves one show by physically threatening the band into playing and, when a Blondie concert is nearly cancelled due to authorities' refusal to provide power, builds a DIY electrical generator that runs on cow dung, gaining him national publicity as the "greatest roadie that ever lived" due to his unusual techniques for fixing equipment. Along the way he clumsily tries to seduce Lola, with whom he has fallen in love, but she rejects his overtures, explaining that she is only 16 and a virgin and is saving her "first time" for Alice Cooper, although she continues to flirt with other musicians whenever she has a chance. But Lola reveals her true feelings for Travis by getting jealous when he spends an evening with Debby Harry.

Lola and Travis argue, causing him to take her immediately to Alice Cooper's show in New York City, where he plans to leave her so she can fulfill her groupie dreams while Travis goes home to Texas. However, Alice has heard of Travis' reputation and convinces him to stay long enough to fix the problems with Alice's sound system. In return for Travis' services, Alice buys him a bus to drive himself back to Texas and gives Lola VIP treatment, with a front row seat, backstage access, and the promise of a romantic evening. Travis finds out that B.B. and Alice Poo are getting married and is determined to return to Texas for their wedding. Despite Lola's pleading that he stay, Travis leaves her in New York, telling her to pursue her dream as she probably won't get another chance with Alice Cooper.

Travis gets home just in time to see his best friend and sister exchange vows. He then gets a phone call from Lola, who has given up being a groupie and traveled to Texas to be with him, and is waiting at a nearby bus stop. Lola now plans to be a psychic instead. As Travis and Lola start to consummate their relationship in the parked bus, they are interrupted by a UFO suddenly landing in front of them, and Lola uses her psychic power to sense that the aliens' spacecraft is broken and they want Travis to fix it.

Cast
The film featured numerous cameos by the musicians in real bands (Asleep at the Wheel, Blondie, and Utopia) as members of Alice Cooper's 'band', politicians (such as then Mayor of Austin Carole McClellan), non-acting show business personalities (such as television composer Jesse Frederick, music producer Joe Gannon and film editor Eric Gardner) and others, some playing a role and others playing themselves.

Meat Loaf – Travis W. Redfish 
Kaki Hunter – Lola Bouilliabase 
Art Carney – Corpus C. Redfish 
Gailard Sartain – B.B. Muldoon 
Don Cornelius – Mohammed Johnson 
Rhonda Bates – Alice Poo 
Joe Spano – Ace 
Richard Marion – George 
Sonny Carl Davis – Bird (as Sonny Davis) 
Ginger Varney – Weather Girl 
Al Mays – Mohammed's Bodyguard 
Cindy Wills – Prom Queen 
Allan Graf – Tiny
Merle Kilgore – Himself 
Jack Elliott – Himself (as Ramblin' Jack Elliott) 
Roy Orbison – Himself 
Hank Williams Jr. and The Bama Band
Hank Williams Jr.
Kerry Craig
Joe Hamilton
Warren Keith
Charles Smith
Dale Stratton
Alice Cooper and the Alice Cooper Band 
Alice Cooper
Sheryl Cooper
Fred Mandel
Davey Johnstone 
Roger Powell 
Kasim Sulton
John Wilcox  
Alvin Crow and The Pleasant Valley Boys
Alvin Crow
D.K. Little 
Pete Finney 
Tiny McFarland 
Roger Crabtree 
Rick Crow and Asleep at the Wheel
Rick Crow
Chris O'Connell 
Bobby Black 
Pat Ryan 
Daniel Levin 
John Nicholas 
Francis Christina 
Dean DeMerritt 
Blondie
Deborah Harry 
Chris Stein 
Clem Burke 
Jimmy Destri 
Nigel Harrison 
Frank Infante 
Larry Lindsey – Jerry 
Marcy Hanson – Groupie 
Carole McClellan – Sheriff 
Ray Benson – Himself 
Joe Gannon – Spittle Manager 
Jesse Frederick – Alice Cooper Roadie 
Eric Gardner – Concert Promoter

Soundtrack
The film's soundtrack album was released in 1980, earning a four out of five rating from AllMusic.

Charts

Release
On August 20, 2013, Shout! Factory released Roadie on Blu-ray.

Reception
Roger Ebert gave the film one and a half stars out of four, writing, "The tour is an invaluable plot device, since it explains a cross-country odyssey during which our heroes meet all sorts of famous singing stars, including Hank Williams Jr., Roy Orbison, Alice Cooper, Asleep at the Wheel, and Deborah Harry with Blondie. If the movie had given us more of their songs, this could have qualified as a concert movie. If it had given us more of Meat Loaf, it might have developed into a character study. But Roadie never makes up its mind. The movie's so genial, disorganized and episodic that we never really care about the characters, and yet whenever someone starts to sing the performance is interrupted for more meaningless plot development."

Giving the film 1 out of 5, TV Guide wrote, "Director Alan Rudolph attempts to paint a portrait of the backstage world of rock 'n' roll but is considerably less successful here than in his other inventive efforts". People wrote, "As portrayed by rock heavy Meat Loaf, Redfish is pure delight, innocent and irresistible; in his first starring role he doesn’t sing a note and still steals the movie. Not that there’s much to steal. Coyly billed as 'the story of a boy and his equipment,' the movie has plenty of paraphernalia, but no notion of how to use it. Director Alan (Welcome to L.A.) Rudolph has signed on Hank Williams Jr., Alice Cooper and Blondie to lend musical authenticity, yet there is no semblance of a story line, apart from an unlikely love affair between Loaf and a tiresome groupie, Kaki Hunter."

The Radio Times wrote, "Alan Rudolph punctuates this straightforward tale with tiresome bar room brawls and noisy knockabout comic moments made bearable only by the occasional celebrity cameo". The Austin Chronicle wrote, "Upon actual viewing of Roadie, I admit to being something less than rollicked, but damned if Roadie didn't try with all its cornball might."

Nathan Rabin reviewed the film favorably for its DVD release, writing, "Rudolph's predilection for the lush glamour of classic films might make him an odd director for a Meat Loaf vehicle, but 1980's Roadie (just released on a no-frills DVD) is a marriage made in heaven rather than the shotgun wedding it initially appears to be".

The review aggregate Rotten Tomatoes gave the film a score of 14% based on 7 reviews.

References

External links
 
 
 
 

1980 films
1980 independent films
1980s musical comedy films
1980s road movies
American independent films
American musical comedy films
American road movies
American rock music films
1980s English-language films
Films directed by Alan Rudolph
Films set in Texas
Road crew
1980 comedy films
1980s American films